The Way We Live Now is a 2001 four-part television adaptation of the Anthony Trollope 1875 novel The Way We Live Now. The serial was first broadcast on the BBC and was directed by David Yates, written by Andrew Davies and produced by Nigel Stafford-Clark. David Suchet starred as Augustus Melmotte, with Shirley Henderson as his daughter Marie, Matthew Macfadyen as Sir Felix Carbury, Cillian Murphy as Paul Montague and Miranda Otto as Mrs Hurtle.

Plot summary

Augustus Melmotte is a foreign financier with a mysterious past. When he and his family move to London, the city's upper crust begins buzzing with rumours about him and a host of characters find their lives changed because of him.

Lady Carbury is a widow living in straitened circumstances with her handsome but dissolute son, Sir Felix, and her modest, intelligent daughter, Henrietta. Sir Felix has gambled away his inheritance and his mother supports them by writing. Her close friend, Mr Broune, a newspaper publisher, reviews her books favourably because of his regard for her and clearly wants their relationship to be closer.

At his gambling club, Felix hears his friends say that Melmotte's daughter, Marie, will have a huge dowry. Returning home, he impulsively tells his mother that he will try to retrieve the family's fortunes by marrying Marie. When the Carburys are invited to a grand ball given at Melmotte's Grosvenor Square mansion, Felix, an experienced ladies' man, meets Marie, a trusting and inexperienced girl, and sweeps her off her feet.

Roger, the Carburys' cousin, is a kind and decent country squire. He has been in love with Henrietta for years but has never said anything, as she has only recently come of age. Paul Montague is a young engineer, formerly Roger's ward. Newly returned to England from America with plans to build a railroad from Utah to Mexico, Paul meets Henrietta when the Carburys visit Roger's estate.

Roger visits London and proposes to Henrietta, who explains that her fondness for him can never become the love he hopes for. Roger refuses to give up, but when he meets Paul later and reveals what happened, Paul discloses that he too is interested in Henrietta. The men's long friendship cools.

Paul and his American partner meet with Melmotte, who agrees to arrange a stock offering.  He invites Sir Felix and a number of his aristocratic friends to join the railroad's board of directors; none of them knows or cares anything about the company's business, but they are delighted at the chance to profit from it.

The stock offering proves a huge success and the share price goes up and up. Melmotte's prestige and influence are greatly enhanced and he begins to be accepted in English society. Paul is anxious to go to America to begin construction, but for some reason Melmotte keeps putting off the financial arrangements that are necessary for the work.

Paul learns that Mrs Hurtle, a woman he was engaged to in America, has come to London. She vanished before the marriage and he assumed that she had thrown him over. Now she tells him that she means to enforce his promise of marriage. Through a combination of bullying and pleading, she keeps a hold on him.

Sir Felix continues to woo Marie and finally approaches Melmotte, who is doubtful of the idea because Felix has no money. Marie convinces Felix to elope, that her father will eventually support them financially. To pay for the trip to New York, she steals a cheque from Melmotte's desk. At the docks Felix fails to board, hung over from a night at his club, while Marie is stopped by constables investigating the stolen cheque and is forced to return to her father's house.

Marie is visited by Felix's sister Henrietta, who informs her that Felix doesn't have the courage to defy Melmotte and has no interest in marrying Marie without a dowry. Marie's feelings for Felix soon change from love to hatred.

Melmotte has had himself elected to Parliament, and on the strength of the successful railroad stock offering, has borrowed huge sums of money and begun other ambitious projects. Only Paul seems to know or care whether the railroad exists. When he returns to London to confront Melmotte, Melmotte warns that if the truth is revealed, Paul and everyone who has invested in the railroad will be ruined. Paul, unwilling to be involved in a fraud even if it makes him rich, tells the whole story to Mr Alf, who promptly publishes it in his newspaper. The railroad company's stock begins to plunge.

Sir Felix is aware of his sister's interest in Paul, and when Henrietta reproaches him for abandoning Marie, he spitefully tells her what he knows about Paul. Henrietta visits Mrs Hurtle, who makes Henrietta believe that her affair is still going on. Henrietta then tells Paul they cannot see each other again.

The precipitous fall of the railroad stock causes Melmotte's fortunes to sink as quickly as they rose. His creditors begin pressing for repayment. As a last resort, he asks Marie to turn over to him a large sum of money he put in her name to protect it from his creditors, but Marie, who has become bitter and cynical since the end of her relationship with Sir Felix, refuses. Melmotte commits suicide. Marie, still wealthy thanks to her nest egg, packs up and leaves London.

With the failure of her son's attempt to marry Marie, Lady Carbury is at the end of her rope financially. The publisher, Mr Broune, proposes marriage to her and she accepts happily.  He persuades her to send Sir Felix, in the charge of an Anglican clergyman, to a remote town in Prussia, far from the temptations of London club life and where he will not be able to importune his mother for funds.

Mrs Hurtle, accepting that Paul will never marry her, quits London; before going she informs Henrietta of the truth. Henrietta and Paul marry, while their former suitors, Roger Carbury and Mrs Hurtle, each learn to accept the situation with some grace. It is revealed at the end that Paul and Henrietta lived a long and happy life, while Mrs Hurtle dies of old age.

Awards
At the 2002 BAFTA Awards, director David Yates and producer Nigel Stafford-Clark collected an award for The Way We Live Now, which won Best Drama Serial. Suchet was nominated as Best Actor. At the 2002 Royal Television Society Programme Awards, Suchet won Actor: Male while Shirley Henderson was nominated for Actor: Female and writer Andrew Davies was nominated for Best Writing. The same year, at the Royal Television Society Craft & Design Awards, the series received four nominations: Costume Design - Drama, Make-Up Design - Drama, Sound - Drama and Tape and Film Editing - Drama.

Cast
David Suchet: Augustus Melmotte
Tony Pritchard: Mr Wakeham
Paloma Baeza: Hetta Carbury
Cheryl Campbell: Lady Carbury
Cillian Murphy: Paul Montague
Miranda Otto: Mrs Hurtle
Allan Corduner: Croll
Tony Britton: Lord Alfred Grendall
Angus Wright: Miles Grendall
Richard Cant: Dolly Longestaffe
Stuart McQuarrie: Lord Nidderdale
Robert Sterne: Portrait Painter
Tom Fahy: Butler - Grosvenor Square
Matthew Macfadyen: Sir Felix Carbury
Lilo Baur: Didon (Marie's maid)
Shirley Henderson: Marie Melmotte
Anne-Marie Duff: Georgiana Longestaffe
Oliver Ford Davies: Mr Longestaffe
Joanna David: Lady Pomona Longestaffe
Maxine Peake: Ruby Ruggles
Trevor Peacock: Mr Ruggles
Nicholas McGaughey: John Crumb
Jon Rumney: Herr Vossner
Helen Schlesinger: Madame Melmotte
Dudley Sutton: Speaker of the House of Commons
Graham Crowden: The Marquis of Auld Reekie
Douglas Hodge: Roger Carbury
David Bradley: Mr Broune
Fenella Woolgar: Lady Julia Monogram
Jim Carter: Mr Brehgert
James Duke: Bank Official
Rob Brydon: Mr Alf
Michael Riley: Hamilton K. Fisker
Derek Smee: Butler - Caversham Hall
Michele Dotrice: Mrs Pipkin
Sarah Niven: Simpson

External links
 

2001 British television series debuts
2001 British television series endings
2000s British drama television series
2000s British television miniseries
Television series set in the 1870s
BBC television dramas
Television shows written by Andrew Davies
English-language television shows
Television shows set in England